The Jingbirok (known in English as the Book of Corrections), written in Hanmun, is a first hand account of the Imjin War written by high ranking Joseon scholar-official Ryu Seong-ryong. Party to high level decision making on the allied Ming-Joseon side and able to access all Joseon records, Ryu Seong-ryong's Jingbirok has become an invaluable source in the study of the conflict, and Chinese-Korean-Japanese relations. In 1969 the Jingbirok was listed as the 132nd of the National Treasures of South Korea.

The writing of the Jingbirok

Ryu Seong-ryong

Ryu Seong-ryong (1542–1607) was born in Uiseong, in Gyeongsang province, during the Korean Joseon Dynasty, to a yangban family of the Pungsan Ryu clan. Passing the Samsai level of the Gwageo civil service examination in 1564, and the Mungwa level in 1566, Ryu rose through the ranks of the scholar-official bureaucracy  holding various positions including Jwauijeong (Second State Councillor) and Ijo Panseo (Minister of Personnel). At the time of the 1592 Japanese invasion of Korea Ryu held the position of a provincial Dochechalsa. During the war Ryu was appointed Yeonguijeong (First State Councillor), and it was in this capacity that he helped direct the Joseon defences, being responsible for all Joseon military units and leaders, including Yi Sun-sin and Gwon Yul.

After the war in 1598, Ryu was ousted from office by factional infighting, although he was later rehabilitated he refused to serve again in high office. The Jingbirok was written and compiled at this time by Ryu in his home village, now  preserved in the Hahoe Folk Village, in today's Andong, North Gyeongsang Province.

Aim of the Jingbirok
Ryu Seong-ryong wrote the Jingbirok in order to prevent such an invasion from happening again, reflecting on the mistakes. In the preface he writes that during the conflict the Joseon state suffered "the loss of three capitals, and collapse everywhere" (三都失守，八方瓦解) reflecting on his own role in this he wrote that he was "not up to the task the nation entrusted, the ills that nation suffered was because of threats not grasped, this cannot be swept away, nor can death atone for this guilt" (無似受國重任，於流離板蕩之際，危不持，顛不扶，罪死無赦). Ryu placed the blame for the disaster suffered by Joseon on his own inadequate emphasis on national security, and was therefore resolved to properly document hard lessons dearly paid for, with the hope that following generations could avoid the mistakes that he had made. Although the Jingbirok includes details of Japanese atrocities, the focus of the Jingbirok is on Joseon failures, and Ryu is harsher in his assessment of his own side than he is of the enemy.

Publication history
The Jingbirok was written in Hanmun;therefore, it was as equally accessible to the classically educated scholars of China, Japan and Vietnam as it was to classically educated Koreans.

Structure
The early form of the Jingbirok  was completed by the time of the 37th year of King Seonjo's reign (1604) and consisted of sixteen scrolls and a coda:

Scrolls One and Two, are written in the form of an annal, being a chronology from 1586 to 1598 of events between the Joseon-Ming allies and the Japanese
Scrolls Three to Five, Roots (芹曝集), background leading up to the invasion
Scrolls Six to Fourteen, Jin-Sa Records (辰巳錄), documents, orders and proclamations made by the author as prime minister
Scrolls Fifteen to Sixteen, Military transcripts (軍門謄錄), transcripts and the author's correspondence  between 1595 and 1598 regarding the conflict
Coda, A Record of the Crisis (亂後雜記), a record of events during the conflict

By 1633 (11th year of King Injo's reign) this had evolved into a widely read two volume format known as the Seoaejip consisting of the Jingibrok and Ryu Seong-ryong's The Anthology of Seoae. In 1647 the Jingibrok was issued as a single stand alone volume.

Known printed editions
Classical Chinese
 1647, published by Gyeongsang-do governor Jo Su-ik 
1695, Japanese Kanban edition published in Kyoto in two volumes
1913, as part of a multi volume collection of Joseon works, Classic Joseon Books Publication Society.

Modern Korean (Hangul)

Japanese (translations)
1876, Translation of Joseon Ryu's Chōhiroku, in one volume, translated by Osanai Ryotaro and Minoru Suzuki
1894, Joseon Chōhiroku, 
1921, Chōhiroku, translated by Nagano Naohiko
1966, Chōhiroku, translated by Soga Masataka, 
1979, Chōhiroku, translated by Pak Chong Myung, The Eastern Library, 

English
The Book of Corrections: Reflections on the National Crisis During the Japanese Invasion of Korea, 1592-1598, an English translation of the Jingbirok, Ryu Seong-ryong, translated by Choi Byong-hyon,

See also
The Jingbirok: A Memoir of Imjin War
The Second World War (book series)

Notes

References

This article is based on the Chinese Wikipedia article on this topic 懲毖錄, and include details taken from the Japanese 懲ヒ録 and Korean 징비록 articles.

External links

Encyclopedia of Korean Culture 

Japanese invasions of Korea (1592–1598)
16th-century documents
17th-century documents
Military memoirs
History books about Korea
National Treasures of South Korea
Korean chronicles
Chinese-language literature of Korea